Jamuguri Academy is a school in Assam state of India. It is an Upper Primary with Secondary School located in the Niz Borbhogia village of Naduar tehsil. It was established in the year 1961, and is now managed by the state's Department of Education. It's an Assamese medium co-educational school.

Jamuguri Academy runs in a government school building. The lowest Class is 6 and the highest class in the school is 10.  There is a library facility available in this school.

This school does not have a playground or residential facilities. The school provides mid-day meal facility, and the meals are prepared in school.

History 

The school was originally established in 1960, by the village raij (a general body composed of the eldest male from each family). It was later taken over by the state government.

Other details

See also 

 Education in Assam

 Board of Secondary Education, Assam

References 

High schools and secondary schools in Assam
1960 establishments in Assam
Educational institutions established in 1960
Sonitpur district